The pallid beach mouse or Ponce de Leon beach mouse (Peromyscus polionotus decoloratus), was known from two locations in Florida, Ponce Park, Volusia County and Bulow, Flagler County. No individuals have been seen since 1959. The average pallid beach mouse was 4 to 8 cm in length. This subspecies burrowed into dunes for protection.

References
  Database entry includes a brief justification of why this subspecies is listed as extinct

External links
NatureServe Report

Peromyscus
Rodent extinctions since 1500
Extinct rodents
Extinct animals of the United States
Mammals described in 1939